Brauchitsch is the surname of a Prussian noble family, first documented in the 13th century at the Silesian village of Chrustenik. Members of the family have been noted as statesmen and high military officers in Germany. Notable members of the family include:

 Ludwig von Brauchitsch (1757–1827) general.
 Bernard von Brauchitsch (1833–1910) general.
 Charlotte von Brauchitsch (née Gordon) (1844–1906) heiress.
 Adolf von Brauchitsch (1876–1935) general.
 Margarete von Brauchitsch (1879–1939), designer.
 Walther von Brauchitsch (1881–1948), field marshal.
 Georg von Brauchitsch (1885–1940), archeologist.
 Manfred von Brauchitsch (1905–2003), auto-racing driver.
 Bernd von Brauchitsch (1911–1974) adjutant to Göring and, after the war, a manager in steel business.
 Eberhard von Brauchitsch (1926–2010), industrial manager.
 Boris von Brauchitsch (born 1963), author, curator and photographer.

Silesian nobility
German noble families
Military families of Germany